Henry (Harry) Parker (1849 - 4 December 1932) was an English swimmer.  He won the amateur one-mile championship three consecutive times, from 1870-72.  These races were held on the River Thames, from Putney to Hammersmith.

By the 1890s Parker was the lessee of the bathing pools at the Tunnels Beaches at Ilfracombe, where he was billed as an "expert swimmer and instructor" and "one of the foremost professors of ornamental swimming."

Harry's younger sister Emily Parker was also an accomplished swimmer.

Harry and his wife Ellen's son Henry Lloyd Parker was also an accomplished swimmer and escapologist.

References

English male swimmers
Male long-distance swimmers
1849 births
1932 deaths